John George Davey (21 June 1847 – 4 May 1878) was an English cricketer. Davey was a right-handed batsman who bowled right-arm roundarm medium pace and who occasionally fielded as a wicket-keeper. He was born at Brighton, Sussex.

Davey made his first-class debut for Sussex against Kent at Crystal Palace Park Cricket Ground in 1869, with him making a further appearance against Kent a week later at the Higher Common Ground, Tunbridge Wells. He made two further first-class appearances for Sussex, against the Marylebone Cricket Club at Lord's Cricket Ground in 1867 and Kent at the same venue in 1873. In his four first-class matches for the county, he scored 66 runs at an average of 13.20, with a high score of 32. In 1874, he made his first-class debut for the Marylebone Cricket Club against Nottinghamshire, with him playing a further first-class match for the club against Surrey in 1876. He played one first-class match for England against a combined Kent and Gloucestershire side at the St Lawrence Ground, Canterbury.

He died at the town of his birth on 4 May 1878.

References

External links
John Davey at ESPNcricinfo
John Davey at CricketArchive

1847 births
1878 deaths
Sportspeople from Brighton
English cricketers
Sussex cricketers
Marylebone Cricket Club cricketers
Non-international England cricketers